Köprüler Yaptırdım Gelip Geçmeye (Karam) is a Turkish folkloric tune (Kaşık Havası). Bende Binem Kar Kara Atlara is a form of the Turkish folkloric tune Kaşık Havası. There are similar folkloric tunes known as Bende Binem Kar Kara Atlara.

References

Turkish music
Turkish songs